Amoako is a surname. Notable people with the surname include:

Isaac Amoako (born 1983), Ghanaian footballer
K. Y. Amoako (born 1944), Ghanaian economist and civil servant
Prince Koranteng Amoako (born 1973), Ghanaian footballer